Rafael Romero Marchent (3 May 1926 – 13 February 2020) was a Spanish director, screenwriter and actor.

Life and career 
Born in Madrid, the son of the author Joaquín Romero Marchent Gómez de Avellaneda, he started his career as an actor, mainly cast in character roles. In 1959 he became assistant director, and in 1965 he made his directorial debut with Hands of a Gunfighter. Specialized in the Spaghetti Western genre, from the late 1970s he was also active on television. His brother Joaquín Luis Romero Marchent was also a director and screenwriter. In the 2000s he taught film and interpretation classes.

He was awarded in 1947 by the Medalla del Círculo de Escritores Cinematográficos for his role in the film La mies es mucha. He married Maruja Tamayo. He died on 13 February 2020 at the age of 93.

Filmography

Director
 Hands of a Gunfighter (1965)
 Sharp-Shooting Twin Sisters (1966)
 Ringo the Lone Rider (1968) 
 Dos cruces en Danger Pass (1967)
 Dead Men Don't Count (1968)
 Uno a uno, sin piedad (1968)
 Garringo (1969) 
 The Avenger, Zorro (1969)  
 Sartana Kills Them All (1971)
 El calor de la llama (1976)
 All Is Possible in Granada (1982)

Actor
 The Bullfighter's Suit (1947)
 Lola Leaves for the Ports (1947) - Curro Mairén
 Don Quixote (1947) - Lacayo (Lackey) (uncredited)
 Alhucemas (1948)
 La vida encadenada (1948)
 Doña María la Brava (1948) - paje Morales
 Mare Nostrum (1948) - Esteban
 The Party Goes On (1948) - Torero
 La mies es mucha (1949) - Modu
 Paz (1949) - Pedro 
 Flor de lago (1950)
 Yo no soy la Mata-Hari (1950) - (uncredited)
 The Lioness of Castille (1951) - Juan de Padilla hijo
 Séptima página (1951) - Javier
 Juzgado permanente (1953)
 Cabaret (1953) - Pepe
 El mensaje (1954)
 The Louts (1954)
 Sor Angélica (1954)
 One Bullet Is Enough (1954)
 El indiano (1955) - Jaime
 La pecadora (1956) - Padre Antonio
 La espera (1956)
 Fulano y Mengano (1957) - Paco
 Un indiano en Moratilla (1958)
 El Cristo de los Faroles (1958) - Rafael
 Pasión bajo el sol (1958)
 Compadece al delincuente (1960)
 Zorro the Avenger (1962) - Juan Aguilar
 Three Ruthless Ones (1964) - Ciudadano que se lava los pies (uncredited)
 Seven Hours of Gunfire (1965) - Ciudadano que lee la carta (uncredited)
 All Is Possible in Granada (1982) - Camarero
 A solas contigo (1990) - Quintero
 Pesadilla para un rico (1996) - Portes
 Al límite (1997) - Juez 2º
 Tiovivo c. 1950 (2004) - Tertuliano

References

External links 
 
 

1926 births 
2020 deaths 
20th-century Spanish people 
Spanish film directors
Spanish male film actors
Spanish television directors
Spanish screenwriters
Spanish male writers
Male screenwriters 
People from Madrid
Spaghetti Western directors